Thomasia triloba is a species of flowering plant in the family Malvaceae and is endemic to the south-west of Western Australia. The species  was first formally described in 1846 by Nikolai Turczaninow in the Bulletin de la Société Impériale des Naturalistes de Moscou from specimens collected by James Drummond. This species of thomasia is listed as  "Priority One" by the Government of Western Australia Department of Biodiversity, Conservation and Attractions, meaning that it is known from only one or a few locations which are potentially at risk, but may be extinct.

References

triloba
Rosids of Western Australia
Plants described in 1846
Taxa named by Nikolai Turczaninow